Ecyrus arcuatus is a species of beetle in the family Cerambycidae. It was described by Charles Joseph Gahan in 1892. It is known from Mexico, Honduras, Guatemala, and United States.

References

Pogonocherini
Beetles described in 1892